Luis Antonio Baraona Fornés was a Chilean politician, who served as the seventh Mayor of Pichilemu between 1924 and 1925, and as a Deputy for the 10th Departmental Constituency of Caupolicán, San Vicente, and San Fernando departments between 1926 and 1930.

Biography
Luis Antonio Baraona Fornés was one of the children of Luis Antonio Baraona Calvo and Concepción Fornés García Reyes. Baraona Fornés married in Santiago on 25 December 1911 with Constanza Ortúzar Fornés; they had children.

He was a member of the Conservative Party of Chile. He was elected Mayor of Pichilemu in 1924, and held the position between 4 May of that year and 24 December 1925, when he resigned to run as candidate for deputy of the 10th Departmental Constituency of Caupolicán, San Vicente, and San Fernando. He was eventually elected deputy for the aforementioned departmental constituency, and held the position between 1926 and 1930; during his time as a member of the Chilean Chamber of Deputies he was a member of the Permanent Commission of Budgets and Objected Decrees.

References

1885 births
Year of death missing
Politicians from Santiago
Conservative Party (Chile) politicians
Deputies of the XXXV Legislative Period of the National Congress of Chile
Mayors of Pichilemu